A rubber stamp is an image or pattern that has been carved, molded, laser engraved or vulcanized onto a sheet of rubber.  Rubber stamping, also called stamping, is a craft in which some type of ink made of dye or pigment is applied to rubber stamp. The rubber is often mounted onto a more stable object such as a wood, brick or an acrylic block. Increasingly the vulcanized rubber image with an adhesive foam backing is attached to a cling vinyl sheet which allows it to be used with an acrylic handle for support. These cling rubber stamps can be stored in a smaller amount of space and typically cost less than the wood mounted versions. They can also be positioned with a greater amount of accuracy due to the stamper's ability to see through the handle being used. Temporary stamps with simple designs can be carved from a potato. The ink-coated rubber stamp is pressed onto any type of medium such that the colored image is transferred to the medium.  The medium is generally some type of fabric or paper.  Other media used are wood, metal, glass, plastic, and rock. High-volume batik uses liquid wax instead of ink on a metal stamp.

Commercially available rubber stamps fall into three categories: stamps for use in the office, stamps used for decorating objects or those used as children's toys.

Business rubber stamps 
There are three distinct types of rubber stamps: traditional, where the pad is in a separate container from the stamp; Self-inking stamps, which have a self-contained die that rests against the pad until the die is flipped 180 degrees to make an imprint; and pre-inked stamps, where the die itself is actually impregnated with the ink.

Rubber stamps for business commonly show an address, corporate logo and business registration number. Some stamps also have movable parts that allow the user to adjust the date or the wording of the stamp. They are used to date incoming mail, as well as to denote special handling for documents. In some countries it is common practice for formal documents such as contracts to be rubber-stamped over the signature as additional evidence of authenticity. The objective is to authenticate the contracts, prevent forging, and increases efficiency as company executives do not have to separately sign individual company documents.

Business stamps are generally available from stationers or direct from the manufacturer. Popular stamps include address stamps, standard word stamps such as received or payment due, and dater stamps. These stamps make up almost 30% sold annually.

Other applications 

Rubber stamps are not exclusively used in the business world. Applications range from education to animals to the food and drinks industry. A few are listed below but there are many more outside of this list:

 Education stamps
 Dietary requirements on food packaging
 Stamping food, e.g. meats (with food grade ink, e.g. Noris 111 meat marking ink)
 Loyalty stamps
 Arts and crafts, e.g. stamping impressions into soaps and clay
 Textiles
 Animal marking, e.g. pigeons before racing

Automated rubber stamps 
Document marking can be done from within the user's word processor.  This can be done manually by creating the "stamps" to appear on the documents in automated document marking software for Microsoft Word.  This allows each page to be stamped as it is printed with the user selected stamps created electronically.

As an art form

Other materials besides rubber may be used to produce a stamp. Woodcut and linocut, the carving of linoleum, are art forms based on the same principles. Linoleum is much harder than rubber and thus requires special tools. Woodcut is mostly used by professional artists, requiring much talent and patience. Rubber carving material can be purchased, but is marketed as a child's toy and not widely used. Additionally, photopolymer stamps are growing in popularity. They are most often produced in a set of coordinated images using a clear polymer material on an acetate carrier sheet for storage and packaging. The stamps are peeled from the carrier sheet and applied to a clear acrylic handle. This allows the stamper to view the image through the handle and effect precise placement of the image where desired. Photopolymer stamps are generally produced in the United States for sale domestically and internationally. Similar clear stamps made of silicone are produced by U.S. companies in China. Silicone stamps have many of the same properties of the photopolymer stamps. The production of clear stamps makes storage of a large collection of images easier, since they are all used with just one set of various sized handles. They are also often very economical being produced in sets of several images which work together to form a cohesive look.

There are several possibilities to vary the look of carved stamps. Paints, pigments and dye inks create different effects, extending the use of rubber stamping from paper to fabrics, wood, metal, glass, and so on. Ink pads can be purchased that allow for embossing and there are markers that can be used to ink stamp pads with colors for a multi-color look. The use of rubber stamps can be combined with other materials. The image may be embellished by the addition of chalks, inks, paints, fibers and a variety of other ephemera and embellishments.

Hand-carved rubber stamps are often used in mail art or artist trading cards because they tend to be small and allow the making of series. The TAM Rubber Stamp Archive has a collection of prints of rubber stamps mail-artists used since 1983 (see link). Stamping is also often used in handmade cardmaking, scrapbooking, and letterboxing.

Stamping communities
Stamping has become a very popular home based craft, and there are a number of forums, some with many thousands of members. Craft stampers tend to be associated with other paper crafts, such as card making and scrapbooking.

See also
 Seal (device)
 Where's George? an American website that utilises rubber stamped dollar bills to track the movement of currency around the world

References

External links
 TAM Rubber Stamp Archive
 Stempelherstellung

Handicrafts
Paper art
Relief printing
Craft materials